Rita Blankenburg (later Schmidt, born 22 February 1942) is a retired German speed skater. She has been coached by Erich Löwenberger.

Schmidt represented her nation at the 1964 Winter Olympics in the 3000 m event and finished in 17th place. She also competed also at the World Allround Speed Skating Championships for Women in 1966, finishing 28th overall.

Between 1959 and 1967 she competed sixteen times at national championships (several national events per year), winning a bronze medal in the 500m in 1966.

Records

Personal records

References

1942 births
German female speed skaters
Speed skaters at the 1964 Winter Olympics
Olympic speed skaters of the United Team of Germany
Speed skaters from Berlin
East German sportswomen
Living people
20th-century German women